Club Deportivo Cajamadrid was a professional basketball and handball team in Spain. It was founded in 1979 and the basketball team played in Liga ACB from 1983 to 1986 and  participated in the Korac Cup during the 1984-85 season. The club was sponsored by Caja Madrid until 1991, when the bank decided to retire its support and continued as a different club called Juventud Alcalá.

The handball section played in Liga ASOBAL until 1991.

Season by season (basketball team)

Honours
Spanish Second Division (1): 1983
Spanish Third Division (1): 1981

Notable players
 José Manuel Beirán
 José Luis Llorente
 Juan Antonio Orenga
 Wayne Brabender
 Ken Howard
 Norris Coleman
 Bob Thornton
 Greg Wiltjer
 Andro Knego

References

External links
Historic website
Profile at ACB.com

Defunct basketball teams in Spain
Former Liga ACB teams
Sports teams in Madrid
Spanish handball clubs
Defunct handball clubs
Basketball teams in the Community of Madrid
Sport in Alcalá de Henares